The Communist Workers' Party (CWP) was a far-left Maoist group in the United States.  It had its origin in 1973 as the Asian Study Group (renamed the Workers' Viewpoint Organization in 1976) established by Jerry Tung, a former member of the Progressive Labor Party (PLP) who had grown disenchanted with the group and disagreed with changes taking place in the party line. The party is mainly remembered as being associated with victims of the Greensboro Massacre of 1979.

The CWP followed the policies of Mao Zedong. The CWP also incorporated aspects of the CPUSA's anti-racist pre-Popular Front program. In particular the CWP emphasized unionization and self-determination for African Americans.

History

Origins

The CWP enjoyed some success in textile cities of North Carolina. The new party established  branches in New York, Boston, Los Angeles, San Francisco Bay Area, Philadelphia, Chicago, Detroit, Greensboro, West Virginia, Colorado and other locations. Before forming itself into a party in October 1979 (the founding congress was held in the backroom of a discothèque in New York City), the group was known as the Workers Viewpoint Organization.  Under its umbrella, it directed groups as the Revolutionary Youth League, the African Liberation Support Committee, and the Trade Union Education League.

1979 Greensboro Massacre

Confrontations with the Ku Klux Klan ("Klan" or "KKK") were particularly acute in Greensboro, North Carolina, where the Klan sought to disrupt the CWP's effort to unionize poor, black mill workers in the Greensboro area. In July 1979, the Klan held a rally and viewing of The Birth of a Nation in China Grove, near Charlotte, which was disrupted by CWP members who burned a Confederate flag and taunted members of the KKK. CWP leader Paul Bermanzohn taunted the Klan in the press, saying "The KKK is one of the most treacherous scum elements produced by the dying system of capitalism" and inviting further confrontation with "We challenge you to attend our rally in Greensboro." 

On November 3, 1979, members of the KKK, including a police informant, and the American Nazi Party drove up to the "Death to the Klan" rally organized by the CWP. Members of both the Klan and the CWP were armed, and an exchange of gunfire soon ensued. Four members of the CWP and one rally participant were killed by the KKK. These deaths became known as the "Greensboro Massacre." Two subsequent trials of KKK and ANP members resulted in acquittals.  In response to the acquittals of the accused killers, the CWP attempted to storm the 1980 Democratic National Convention and succeeded in setting off firecrackers in Madison Square Garden.

Ideology
From its earliest phase as the Workers' Viewpoint Organization, the CWP had considered itself as Maoist and supported the so-called Gang of Four after Mao's death. Following the line of Mao, it considered the Soviet Union and its bloc as restored capitalist countries. For some time after the arrest of the Gang of Four, the group remained silent about the events in China but later accused China also of having taken the capitalist road.

In 1980, there was a dramatic reversal of this line. In his book The Socialist Road, CWP Chairman Jerry Tung announced that both the Soviet Union and China were socialist, although an unhealthy bureaucracy had taken shape in the governments of both countries.

An article published in the Workers Viewpoint in 1976 criticised a social liberal and libertine view of sexuality as "the bourgeoisie’s attempts to dope us with degenerate culture and fascist ideology." The article opposed pornography as representing anti-woman American bourgeois hedonism (it singled out the film Snuff) and argued that homosexuality "is a form of social sickness, a form of social perversion. It is a form of bourgeois ideology which appeals especially to the petty bourgeoisie because of its appearance as sexual freedom."

Demise
Subsequent to the Greensboro massacre, the group gave up its Leninist structure and moved towards a social democratic formation that would work for peaceful transition to socialism; it dissolved the Communist Workers' Party and formed the New Democratic Movement in 1985. The New Democratic Movement lasted only a few years. The most important remnant of the CWP/NDM can be found in the Greensboro Justice Fund, which continues to this day and promotes groups struggling for social justice.

Footnotes

Publications    

 Preliminary Draft on the Asian national question in America: Part 1, The Chinese National Question. n.c.: Asian Study Group, 1973.
 Build Marxist-Leninist Leadership of the Women's Movement: Women and Men Unite Against Sexism, Racism, and Imperialism. New York : Workers Viewpoint Organization, 1975.
 Eternal Glory to Chairman Mao, Greatest Marxist of the Contemporary Era New York: Workers Viewpoint Organization, 1976.
 The African Peoples' Struggle Will Surely Triumph!: Build the Communist Leadership of the African Liberation Support Committee!. New York: Workers Viewpoint Organization, 1977.
 Fight for the Real Emancipation of Women!: Smash the Double Yoke of Capitalism and Domestic Slavery = Luchen por la Verdadera Liberación de Mujeres!: Aplaste el Doble Yugo del Capitalismo y Esclavitud Domestica. New York: Workers Viewpoint Organization, 1977.
 Communists Should Be the Advanced Elements of the Proletariat. New York: Workers Viewpoint Organization, 1978.
 Whip Weber now! New York: Workers Viewpoint Organization, 1979.
 Turn the Country Upside Down to Beat Back the Renewed Wave of Attacks from the Capitalists' tools: KKK, Nazis, Pigs, and FBI. New York: Committee to Avenge the Murder of the Communist Workers Party (WV) 5, 1980.
 The Current Revolutionary Situation: Our Tasks. Phil Thompson New York: Communist Workers Party, 1980s.
 Jerry Tung, The Socialist Road: Character of Revolution in the U.S. and Problems of Socialism in the Soviet Union and China. New York: Cesar Cauce Publishers, 1981.
 The Afro-American National Question. New York: The Party, 1981.
 Scott Van Valkenburg, Central America: Communist Threat? New York: Communist Workers Party, 1984.

See also 
 New Communist movement
 New Left

Further reading
 Signe Waller, Love And Revolution: A Political Memoir: People’s History Of The Greensboro Massacre, Its Setting And Aftermath. London: Rowman & Littlefield. 2002.

Archives 
 Workers Viewpoint. New York, NY.  Publisher: Communist Workers Party. 1983-1986. Box: 252a, current.
 Tamiment Library Boxed Newspapers Collection. 1873-, (Bulk 1960-1990).

External links 
Greensboro Justice Fund
Civil Rights Greensboro
Articles on the Ku Klux Klan and the Communist Workers Party from The New York Times.
Communist Workers Party at the Encyclopedia of Anti-Revisionism Online

Anti-racist organizations in the United States
Political parties established in 1973
Defunct Maoist parties in the United States
Defunct communist parties in the United States
Political parties disestablished in 1985
1973 establishments in the United States
1985 disestablishments in the United States